In mathematics, a ternary relation or triadic relation is a finitary relation in which the number of places in the relation is three.  Ternary relations may also be referred to as 3-adic, 3-ary, 3-dimensional, or 3-place.

Just as a binary relation is formally defined as a set of pairs, i.e. a subset of the Cartesian product  of some sets A and B, so a ternary relation is a set of triples, forming a subset of the Cartesian product  of three sets A, B and C.

An example of a ternary relation in elementary geometry can be given on triples of points, where a triple is in the relation if the three points are collinear. Another geometric example can be obtained by considering triples consisting of two points and a line, where a triple is in the ternary relation if the two points determine (are incident with) the line.

Examples

Binary functions

A function  in two variables, mapping two values from sets A and B, respectively, to a value in C associates to every pair (a,b) in  an element f(a, b) in C. Therefore, its graph consists of pairs of the form . Such pairs in which the first element is itself a pair are often identified with triples.

Cyclic orders

Given any set A whose elements are arranged on a circle, one can define a ternary relation R on A, i.e. a subset of A3 = , by stipulating that  holds if and only if the elements a, b and c are pairwise different and when going from a to c in a clockwise direction one passes through b. For example, if A = {  } represents the hours on a clock face, then  holds and  does not hold.

Betweenness relations

Ternary equivalence relation

Congruence relation

The ordinary congruence of arithmetics

which holds for three integers a, b, and m if and only if m divides a − b, formally may be considered as a ternary relation.  However, usually, this instead is considered as a family of binary relations between the a and the b, indexed by the modulus m.  For each fixed m, indeed this binary relation has some natural properties, like being an equivalence relation; while the combined ternary relation in general is not studied as one relation.

Typing relation

A typing relation  indicates that  is a term of type  in context , and is thus a ternary relation between contexts, terms and types.

Schröder rules

References

Further reading

Mathematical relations

ru:Тернарное отношение